The 2016–17 Phoenix Fuel Masters season was the second season of the franchise in the Philippine Basketball Association (PBA).

Key dates

2016
October 30: The 2016 PBA draft took place at Midtown Atrium, Robinson Place Manila.

Draft picks

Special draft

Regular draft

Roster

Philippine Cup

Eliminations

Standings

Game log

|- style="background:#fcc;"
| 1
| November 23
| Blackwater
| L 87–94
| Simon Enciso (25)
| Willy Wilson (14)
| Cyrus Baguio (5)
| Smart Araneta Coliseum
| 0–1
|- style="background:#cfc;"
| 2
| November 30
| San Miguel
| W 92–85
| JC Intal (22)
| Willy Wilson (18)
| Simon Enciso (9)
| Ynares Center
| 1–1

|- style="background:#cfc;"
| 3
| December 4
| Mahindra
| W 114–104
| JC Intal (24)
| Prince Caperal (17)
| Baguio, Enciso (5)
| Smart Araneta Coliseum
| 2–1
|- style="background:#fcc;"
| 4
| December 10
| Star
| L 79–123
| Simon Enciso (16)
| Willy Wilson (7)
| Enciso, W. Wilson (4)
| Mall of Asia Arena
| 2–2
|- style="background:#fcc;"
| 5
| December 16
| TNT
| L 98–117
| Mark Borboran (18)
| Borboran, Caperal (6)
| Simon Enciso (5)
| Smart Araneta Coliseum
| 2–3
|- style="background:#cfc;"
| 6
| December 21
| Meralco
| W 94–90
| Matthew Wright (22)
| Borboran, Caperal, Wright (8)
| Cyrus Baguio (10)
| Filoil Flying V Centre
| 3–3
|- style="background:#cfc;"
| 7
| December 28
| GlobalPort
| W 101–99
| Mark Borboran (23)
| Matthew Wright (9)
| Baguio, Wright (4)
| Cuneta Astrodome
| 4–3

|- style="background:#fcc;"
| 8
| January 8
| Rain or Shine
| L 82–97
| Matthew Wright (26)
| Matthew Wright (12)
| Enciso, Wright (5)
| Smart Araneta Coliseum
| 4–4
|- style="background:#cfc;"
| 9
| January 18
| NLEX
| W 102–91
| Simon Enciso (21)
| Matthew Wright (12)
| Matthew Wright (9)
| Cuneta Astrodome
| 5–4
|- style="background:#cfc;"
| 10
| January 22
| Barangay Ginebra
| W 79–73
| Matthew Wright (18)
| Willy Wilson (12)
| Matthew Wright (5) 
| PhilSports Arena
| 6–4
|- style="background:#fcc;"
| 11
| January 27
| Alaska
| L 85–106
| Matthew Wright (18)
| Matthew Wright (8)
| Matthew Wright (4)
| Cuneta Astrodome
| 6–5

Playoffs

Bracket

Game log

|- style="background:#fcc;"
| 1
| February 4
| Star
| L 83–114
| Matthew Wright (19)
| Doug Kramer (12)
| Dehesa, Intal (3)
| Smart Araneta Coliseum
| 0–1
|- style="background:#fcc;"
| 2
| February 6
| Star
| L 71–91
| Matthew Wright (24)
| Willy Wilson (10)
| JC Intal (4)
| Smart Araneta Coliseum
| 0–2

Commissioner's Cup

Eliminations

Standings

Game log

|- style="background:#cfc;"
| 1
| March 18
| Blackwater
| W 118–116 (2OT)
| Eugene Phelps (53)
| Eugene Phelps (21)
| RJ Jazul (6)
| Cuneta Astrodome
| 1–0
|- style="background:#fcc;"
| 2
| March 22
| Star
| L 82–101
| Jameel McKay (34)
| Jameel McKay (20)
| RJ Jazul (5)
| Smart Araneta Coliseum
| 1–1
|- style="background:#fcc;"
| 3
| March 26
| TNT
| L 109–134
| Jameel McKay (31)
| Jameel McKay (11)
| JC Intal (5)
| Ynares Center
| 1–2

|- style="background:#cfc;"
| 4
| April 1
| Barangay Ginebra
| W 94–91
| Matthew Wright (27)
| Jameel McKay (28)
| Cyrus Baguio (5)
| University of Southeastern Philippines Gym
| 2–2
|- style="background:#fcc;"
| 5
| April 7
| San Miguel
| L 88–110
| Jameel McKay (21)
| Jameel McKay (16)
| Matthew Wright (7)
| Mall of Asia Arena
| 2–3
|- style="background:#fcc;"
| 6
| April 12
| Rain or Shine
| L 94–96
| Jameel McKay (27)
| Jameel McKay (18)
| Jameel McKay (6)
| Smart Araneta Coliseum
| 2–4
|- style="background:#cfc;"
| 7
| April 21
| Alaska
| W 94–86
| Jameel McKay (42)
| Jameel McKay (22)
| RJ Jazul (8)
| Smart Araneta Coliseum
| 3–4
|- align="center"
|colspan="9" bgcolor="#bbcaff"|All-Star Break

|- style="background:#fcc;"
| 8
| May 3
| Meralco
| L 66–81
| Jameel McKay (16)
| Jameel McKay (16)
| RJ Jazul (5)
| Smart Araneta Coliseum
| 3–5
|- style="background:#cfc;"
| 9
| May 5
| GlobalPort
| W 84–72
| Jameel McKay (22)
| Jameel McKay (20)
| six players (2)
| Smart Araneta Coliseum
| 4–5
|- style="background:#fcc;"
| 10
| May 21
| Mahindra
| L 121–122 (OT)
| Jameel McKay (18)
| Jameel McKay (12)
| Jameel McKay (7)
| Mall of Asia Arena
| 4–6
|- style="background:#fcc;"
| 11
| May 27
| NLEX
| L 114–116
| Matthew Wright (42)
| Jameel McKay (14)
| four players (4)
| Ynares Center
| 4–7

Playoffs

Bracket

Game log

|- style="background:#fcc;" 
| 1 
| June 6 
| San Miguel 
| L 96–115
| Jameel McKay (20)
| Jameel McKay (13)
| Matthew Wright (7)
| Smart Araneta Coliseum 
| 0–1

Governors' Cup

Eliminations

Standings

Game log

|- style="background:#cfc;"
| 1
| July 19
| Kia
| W 118–105
| Eugene Phelps (33)
| Eugene Phelps (14)
| three players (3)
| Smart Araneta Coliseum
| 1–0
|- style="background:#cfc;"
| 2
| July 22
| Alaska
| W 95–93
| Eugene Phelps (29)
| Eugene Phelps (14)
| RJ Jazul (5)
| Mall of Asia Arena
| 2–0
|- style="background:#fcc;"
| 3
| July 26
| GlobalPort
| L 91–100
| Eugene Phelps (32)
| Eugene Phelps (17)
| Eugene Phelps (5)
| Smart Araneta Coliseum
| 2–1
|- style="background:#fcc;"
| 4
| July 30
| NLEX
| L 91–95
| Eugene Phelps (31)
| Eugene Phelps (18)
| Eugene Phelps (6)
| Smart Araneta Coliseum
| 2–2

|- style="background:#fcc;"
| 5
| August 6
| Blackwater
| L 86–92
| Jazul, Phelps (13)
| Eugene Phelps (17)
| Willy Wilson (4)
| Smart Araneta Coliseum
| 2–3
|- style="background:#fcc;"
| 6
| August 18
| Meralco
| L 104–107
| Brandon Brown (38)
| Brandon Brown (9)
| RJ Jazul (6)
| Smart Araneta Coliseum
| 2–4
|- style="background:#fcc;"
| 7
| August 23
| Star
| L 81–100
| Brandon Brown (33)
| Brandon Brown (23)
| RJ Jazul (4)
| Smart Araneta Coliseum
| 2–5
|- style="background:#fcc;"
| 8
| August 25
| TNT
| L 103–110
| Brandon Brown (49)
| Brandon Brown (19)
| three players (5)
| Smart Araneta Coliseum
| 2–6
|- style="background:#fcc;"
| 9
| August 30
| Barangay Ginebra
| L 92–105
| Brandon Brown (26)
| Brandon Brown (18)
| RJ Jazul (8)
| Mall of Asia Arena
| 2–7

|- style="background:#fcc;" 
| 10
| September 13
| Rain or Shine 
| L 111–116
| Matthew Wright (36)
| Brandon Brown (20)
| Brandon Brown (4)
| Ynares Center 
| 2–8
|- style="background:#fcc;" 
| 11
| September 20
| San Miguel
| L 107–109
| Brandon Brown (30)
| Brandon Brown (17)
| Brown, Wright (4)
| Ynares Center 
| 2–9

Transactions

Free agency

Trades

Philippine Cup

Governors' Cup

Recruited imports

Awards

References

Phoenix Fuel Masters season
Phoenix Super LPG Fuel Masters seasons